Since Belgium has three national languages — Dutch, French and German — Belgian names are similar to those in the neighbouring countries: the Netherlands, France and Germany. Place names (regions, towns, villages, hamlets) with a particle meaning "from" (de in French, del in Walloon, or van in Dutch) are the most numerous. An uncapitalised particle sometimes indicates nobility.

Here is for example the chronological list of Ministers-President of the Walloon Region :

For French family names among the Walloons and other francophones of Belgium, see French name.

The twenty most common French surnames in Belgium are respectively Dubois, Lambert, Dupont, Martin, Dumont, Leroy, Leclercq, Simon, Laurent, François, Denis, Renard, Thomas, Lejeune, Gérard, Petit, Mathieu, Lemaire, Charlier, and Bertrand. Sources

Some surnames have an unclear origin, like Berger, meaning shepherd in French, and mountaineer in Dutch and German. The particle De also means From or From the in French and means The in Dutch, which does not help finding the origin.

Flemish surnames are also common, due to Flemish economic immigration from 1850 to 1950. See Flanders name.

There are also a lot of typical Walloon surnames, like Monami (fr: Mon ami, en: My friend), Dehasse (fr: de Hasselt, en: from Hasselt), Delcroix (fr: de la Croix, en: from the Cross), Delhaize or Donnay (some famous tennis equipment in the 1980s).

Even crossed etymologies can be found like Deflandre (meaning in French from Flanders) or Dehasse (fr: de Hasselt, en: from Hasselt, in Flemish Region).

Notes

Wallonia